The Mountain Woman is a 1921 American drama film directed by Charles Giblyn and written by Ashley T. Locke. It is based on the 1919 novel A Pagan of the Hills by Charles Neville Buck. The film stars Pearl White, Corliss Giles, Richard Travers, George Barnum, Warner Richmond and John Webb Dillion. The film was released on January 23, 1921, by Fox Film Corporation.

Cast             
Pearl White as Alexander McGiverns
Corliss Giles as Jerry O'Keefe
Richard Travers as Jack Halloway 
George Barnum as Aaron McGiverns
Warner Richmond as Bud Sellers
John Webb Dillion as Will Brent 
Jack Baston as Jase Mallows
Charles E. Graham as Lute Brown

References

External links

1921 films
1920s English-language films
Silent American drama films
1921 drama films
Fox Film films
Films directed by Charles Giblyn
American silent feature films
American black-and-white films
Films based on American novels
1920s American films